Rainbow capitalism (also called pink capitalism, homocapitalism or gay capitalism) is the involvement of capitalism and consumerism in the LGBT movement. It developed in the 20th and 21st centuries as the LGBT community became more accepted in society and developed sufficient purchasing power, known as pink money. Early rainbow capitalism was limited to gay bars and gay bathhouses, though it expanded to most industries by the early-21st century.

Marketing to the LGBT community has played a major role in promoting social acceptance of LGBT people, including increased LGBT representation in media and advertising, though it has also perpetuated stereotypes of gay men. LGBT people are often poorer than heterosexual people when adjusting for other factors and often have more difficulty finding and securing work, though increased protections for LGBT individuals work to counteract this in some countries. Some governments and politicians use LGBT rights to support their foreign policy, either by supporting pressure on other countries to adopt LGBT protections or by opposing immigration from these countries.

Capitalism incentivizes corporations to promote LGBT rights to increase worker satisfaction, expand the consumer base, and maintain a positive public image. Many CEOs of corporations support LGBT rights through personal belief. Some companies in the United States have been criticized for expressing nominal support for the LGBT community while also supporting anti-LGBT politicians. LGBT people can also be victims of gentrification.

Opponents of corporate pride include right-wing and left-wing activists, who believe that corporate support for LGBT rights goes too far or not far enough, respectively. 76% of LGBT Americans support corporate presence in Pride parades.

Historical context 

According to some authors, the global evolution of "pink capitalism" has been parallel to the development of modern capitalism in the West. Although historical evidence shows that diversity of sexualities has always existed, different periods in businesses' development targeted at the LGBT community which have contributed to the construction of diverse sexual identities, can be distinguished. The creation of businesses that catered to the LGBT community corresponded to the beginning of the first drive for LGBT rights. This first LGBT movement was attacked between the First and Second World Wars, during the rise of fascism in Europe.

After the Second World War, Western culture was influenced by the homophobia of fascism. Although LGBT consumption remained marginal, during this time various homophile associations were created to seek positive assessment of homosexuality by society through meetings, publications, or charity parties. These associations opposed behaviors associated with homosexuals deemed marginal and perverted, such as promiscuity, cruising, prostitution, saunas and erotic magazines.

In the United States, marketing toward gay Americans began in "underground" gay communities in the late-19th century, occurring after urbanization allowed these communities to come together. Sellers were often unaware that a community they serviced was associated with the gay movement, though many bathhouses, brothels, and bars were sometimes operated for the gay community. The relocation of enlisted men during and after World War II allowed gay neighborhoods to form, LGBT periodicals emerged, and the 1958 Supreme Court decision One, Inc. v. Olesen legalized materials featuring discussion of homosexuality. The Stonewall riots shifted perceptions of the gay community in 1969, and the gay community was recognized as a legitimate economic market in the 1970s. Marketing to the gay community was complicated by the AIDS crisis in the 1980s, but it also further elevated awareness of the gay community.

The gay movement resulted in a negative social response, in part driven by the HIV/AIDS pandemic, which in turn led to the development of the LGBT movement by discriminated gay groups. During the 1990s, the discrimination of the LGBT community diminished, broadening LGBT people's access to formerly heteronormative jobs. This resulted in increased purchasing power for the LGBT community, or the creation of "pink money". Homosexuals in particular represented a large portion of this purchasing power. The trend is closely related to that of DINKs, couples with two incomes and no children.

Mechanisms

Social acceptance 
Capitalist accommodation of the LGBT community has caused a significant increase in social tolerance for the community, contributing to the expansion civil and political rights for LGBT people. Public image of the LGBT community has been affected by the increasing acceptance of gay men in advertising, entertainment, fashion trends. In these formats, the LGBT community is primarily represented by younger white gay men, and LGBT representation is often not representative of the community as a whole. Television shows such as Queer Eye portrayed a specific identity of the gay community. These perceptions may also be shared by members of the LGBT community:The quantity of LGBT-friendly advertising and LGBT representation in marketing increased in the early 2010s through the use of human interest advertisement, but this increase has focused on specific intersections of sexuality, class, age, and race, while most remain underrepresented. In the 1990s and 2000s, the term "metrosexual" was often used to market traditionally LGBT trends to heterosexual men. These concepts are considered to have significantly benefited the LGBT community through increased acceptance in society and breaking down of gender norms while also contributing to the perpetuation of LGBT stereotypes.

Social marketing is the intentional use of marketing to achieve social tolerance and social acceptance. Businesses often have the advantage of needing to appease only their target market rather than a majority of the public at large, as is the case in politics. LGBT individuals are also more likely to be early adopters of new products. This has caused businesses to be more likely to accept LGBT individuals and communities before the general public and legal protections. The majority of Fortune 500 companies established nondiscrimination policies by the 2010s and guaranteed equal benefits to same-sex couples.

Politics and the LGBT movement

Historical views 
The first modern political movements advocating sexual freedoms and sexual rights date back to the Age of Enlightenment in Europe, during which many traditional ideas of medievalism and feudalism were challenged. According to Michel Foucault, this period saw a movement away from religious connotations of sex to views of "unnaturalness".

The role of sexuality was debated by writers and philosophers of the era. Plays during this time would transgress gender norms, though LGBT themes were often implicit, and Libertine and Gothic writers sometimes experimented with representation of homosexual activity. Liberal philosophers such as Montesquieu and Cesare Beccaria advocated the rights of due process for those accused of sodomy, and Marquis de Sade adapted the arguments of John Locke to support sexual expression as amoral. Conservative commentators viewed these developments as having a "corrupt impact" on women. The earliest organized LGBT movements formed in the late-19th and early-20th centuries from the communities centered around specific industries that catered to LGBT groups, such as gay bars.

Economic aspects 
According to the 2000 census, lesbian, gay, and bisexual individuals and couples in the United States are equally as likely to be poor as heterosexual individual couples. 7% of same-sex female couples were in poverty, 4% of same-sex male couples were in poverty, and 5% of heterosexual couples were in poverty. After adjusting for various family characteristics, LGBT families are more likely to be poor than heterosexual families. Several studies conducted in the 1980s and 1990s found that the number of LGBT Americans that experienced employment discrimination ranged between 16% and 68%. Gay men were also found to earn 10% to 32% less than similarly qualified heterosexual men. Transgender people were found to have high unemployment, and those who were employed received low earnings.

In the 21st century, the gay rights movement has produced greater protections for LGBT people as workers and as consumers. In the United States, accommodation of the LGBT community through capitalist mechanisms has resulted in economic and societal protections for the LGBT community greater than those prescribed under the law. Under the American economic system, employers are incentivized to support the workforce to achieve greater efficiency. This cooperation has resulted in the creation of employee resource groups that allow for organization improvement of LGBT employment. Corporations that support workplace diversity are more likely to protect LGBT employees and executives beyond what is required by the law. Capitalism also incentivizes corporations to incorporate workplace equality policies to achieve greater customer satisfaction. Corporations with LGBT workplace equality policies are viewed more favorably by customers, employees, and partners. Corporations that implement these policies see benefits in marketing capability and overall improvement in performance.

Diplomatic aspects 
The concept of "homocapitalism" is the application of gay rights issues and involvement of LGBT communities in international trade and foreign aid. In most African countries, same-sex marriage is seen as "ungodly, un-African, homonegative, unnatural and unacceptable", often invoking religious ideas of Christianity, Islam, or traditional African religions. Western nations, such as the United States and the United Kingdom, apply political and financial pressure for these countries to adopt legal protections for LGBT people. Countries that refuse to provide these protections are sometimes boycotted by governments and private donors. This is in contrast with predominantly Buddhist and Hindu countries, where homosexual activity is typically not prohibited on religious grounds.

Far-right politicians, such as British MP David Coburn, have also used LGBT issues and the persecution of LGBT minorities in other countries to advocate homonationalism. Homonationalism, a term coined by queer theorist Jasbir Puar, refers to the growing acceptance of LGBT rights by Western nations coupled with the complicity of LGBT individuals and organizations involved in nationalist politics. This ideology first arose within the context of the War on Terror, as the United States positioned itself as LGBT-friendly in opposition to the seemingly homophobic Muslim world. It has also been used by the Israeli government to justify its position in the Israeli–Palestinian conflict by comparing its stronger protections of LGBT rights to those of Palestine.

LGBT people involved in the American anti-war movement criticize the broader LGBT community for its tolerance of military activity and military enlistment. When military whistleblower Chelsea Manning’s nomination to the board of San Francisco Pride was rescinded in 2013, local LGBT groups organized and distributed petitions, claiming that the rescindment was politically motivated. Anti-war activists have also criticized weapons manufacturers such as Axon Enterprise and Raytheon Technologies for participating in Pride Month.

Corporate involvement in LGBT Pride 
Major corporations have become more active in LGBT Pride events in the early-21st century. Many corporations celebrate Pride Month by incorporating it into marketing and publicly expressing support for the LGBT community. In the United States, some of these corporations have been criticized for making campaign donations to legislators that oppose LGBT rights. Other corporations are praised for providing material support to the LGBT community during Pride Month. Kellogg's has been praised for celebrating Pride Month by donating to GLAAD and featuring content about preferred gender pronouns. Many corporations release pride themed products during Pride Month, and contribute to LGBT nonprofit groups using the proceeds. Adidas, Apple, Disney, Nike, Peloton, and other major brands donated to The Trevor Project and other LGBT nonprofit organizations in 2020.

Many factors may affect whether a corporation takes a stance on LGBT issues. Protection of LGBT workers results in higher job satisfaction and increased performance. Support for LGBT rights is also associated with seeking a positive public image, particularly for corporations that have high brand-awareness. LGBT people within the company may also influence the behavior of a corporation. The presence of openly LGBT employees in a workforce correlates with corporate support for LGBT rights, and employee resource groups for LGBT workers are sometimes supported by corporations, giving these groups involvement in decisions regarding LGBT issues. Such involvement was a factor in the partial repeal of the Religious Freedom Restoration Act in Indiana and the bathroom bill in North Carolina. Many CEOs and corporate executives also personally support LGBT rights and seek to direct their companies in line with their personal beliefs.

Neighborhoods 

These processes are especially evident in the dynamics of gay neighborhoods, which attracted LGBT people with their affordability and the social security provided by living with other sexual minorities. These neighborhoods, after decreasing social stigma made them "trendy", then gradually underwent the gentrification process. Rising prices expelled the LGBT population that could not afford the new expenses. An increasingly specialized market developed around the LGBT community in parallel with these other events. This market specifically developed around the needs of the LGBT community, selling services and products exclusively designed to meet their needs. Different companies and firms in turn began incorporating the defense of LGBT rights into their company policies and codes of conduct, and even financing LGBT events.

This kind of sociosexual relations appraisement is characteristic of gay modelling, which has its origin in the companies' new formation of a concentrated sexual market through rainbow capitalism:

Response

Politicians 
In the United States, Republican politicians have criticized corporations for taking stances in favor of LGBT rights. Florida Governor Ron DeSantis and other Republicans criticized Disney for being "woke" after it challenged the Florida Parental Rights in Education Act in 2022.

Protest 

Many groups protest corporate involvement and support of LGBT Pride. When Pride Glasgow started charging an attendance fee in 2015, a group of activists organised Free Pride Glasgow to be held on the same day, and on the day of Pride Glasgow every year since, as a free alternative that features protest rather than celebration. During the 2020 George Floyd protests in the United States, some groups like The Okra Project criticized LGBT Pride celebrations as overlooking the issues faced by the African-American LGBT community.

Following the passage of gay marriage in Spain, members of the LGBT community felt the Pride Parade was no longer protest demonstration and instead becoming a tourist business. Since 2006, several demonstrations against LGBT commodification have been held annually in suburbs of Madrid, called Alternative Pride or Critical Pride (Orgullo Alternativo or Orgullo Crítico). The first Indignant Pride (Orgullo Indignado) parade was held, calling for a different sexuality regardless of economic performance which should take into account gender, ethnicity, age and social class intersectionalities besides other non-normative corporalities. Later, the event retrieved the name Critical Pride (Orgullo Crítico), based on in part on objections to pink capitalism.

Support 
Advocates of greater corporate involvement in LGBT Pride say that corporate support for the LGBT community can influence legislation, increase access for LGBT people, and reinforce broad support for acceptance of LGBT people in society. In 2020, The Trevor Project found that a majority of underage LGBT Americans felt more positively about their sexual identity because of brands that support the LGBT community. 76% of LGBT Americans supported corporate participation in Pride Month events, in contrast with organizers of many Pride events.

See also

References

External links 

LGBT and the economy
LGBT history
LGBT rights
LGBT culture
Queer theory
Capitalism
Anti-capitalism
Socialism and LGBT topics